Pablo César Peña (born 30 January 1999) is an Argentine professional footballer who plays as a right-back.

Career
Peña is a product of the Godoy Cruz youth system. On 29 May 2018, the right-back signed his first professional contract with the club. Peña was promoted into the first-team squad of manager Diego Martínez in December 2020, with his senior debut subsequently arriving on 27 December during a 6–1 loss away to Racing Club in the Copa de la Liga Profesional; featuring for the full duration.

In the summer 2021, Peña began playing for Danish amateur club FC Kalundborg.

Career statistics
.

Notes

References

External links

1999 births
Living people
Place of birth missing (living people)
Argentine footballers
Argentine expatriate footballers
Association football defenders
Argentine Primera División players
Godoy Cruz Antonio Tomba footballers
Argentine expatriate sportspeople in Denmark
Expatriate men's footballers in Denmark